William Bryant (born William Robert Klein; January 31, 1924 – June 26, 2001) was an American actor.

Film
Born in Detroit, Bryant was a character actor who appeared in films such as King Dinosaur (1955), Escape from San Quentin (1957), Experiment in Terror (1962) with Glenn Ford, How to Murder Your Wife and The Great Race with Jack Lemmon, What Did You Do in the War, Daddy? (1966), McQ (1974), and Walking Tall Part II (1975).

He also played several roles in the classic western movies Heaven with a Gun (1969), Chisum (1970), Macho Callahan (1970), Wild Rovers (1971), The Deadly Trackers (1973).

Television
Most of his career was made on television, including Hallmark Hall of Fame, Frontier, Casey Jones, Tales of the Texas Rangers, The Gray Ghost, Maverick, The Rebel, Have Gun – Will Travel, The Rifleman, Laramie, The Virginian, Rawhide, Lancer, Miami Undercover, The Blue Angels, Ripcord, Combat!, Empire, Mission: Impossible, Mannix, Gunsmoke (S2E25 - “Bureaucrat”, S4E37 - “The Constable” & S12E12 - “Quaker Girl”), Bonanza, The Man from U.N.C.L.E., The Wild Wild West, Death Valley Days, Alias Smith and Jones, Banacek, McCloud, Columbo, Petrocelli, Cannon, The Rockford Files, Barnaby Jones, Code R, The Fall Guy, Shazam!, Hardcastle and McCormick and many others.

He played Colonel Crook in sixteen episodes of the TV series Hondo,  was on Emergency! (1972–1978) as different engine company captains, Branded (1965) as General Ulysses S. Grant, and in Lancer (1968) as Sheriff Gabe.

 Filmography 

 References Encyclopedia of Television Series, Pilots and Specials: 1974-1984,'' by Vincent Terrace

External links

1924 births
2001 deaths
American male film actors
American male television actors
Male actors from Detroit
20th-century American male actors
Jewish American male actors
20th-century American Jews